Travis Neil Brooks OAM (born 16 July 1980 in Melbourne, Victoria) is a field hockey forward from Australia, who won the gold medal with the Men's National Team at the 2004 Summer Olympics in Athens. He made his international debut in Canberra, on 15 February 2003, during the second Test of the series against the Netherlands, and played a starring role in The Kookaburras Sultan Azlan Shah Cup win in January 2004 with two goals in the final. Brooks played in the Australian team at the 2008 Beijing Olympics, winning a bronze medal.

Travis Brooks retired from International Hockey in November 2008 with 143 International Caps , after competing in the 2008 Beijing Olympics. He now lives in Melbourne and is actively part of the Waverley Hockey Club, his original local club.

On 26 January 2005, Brooks was awarded the Medal of the Order of Australia for "service to sport as a Gold Medallist at the Athens 2004 Olympic Games."

International tournaments
 2004 – Olympic Games, Athens (1st place)
 2005 – Champions Trophy, Chennai (1st place)
 2006 – Commonwealth Games, Melbourne (1st place)
 2007 – Champions Trophy, Kuala Lumpur (2nd place)
 2008 – Olympic Games, Beijing (3rd place)

Trivia 
On 14 January 2009 Travis was the subject of the first episode of the second series of popular Australian television documentary series Who Do You Think You Are?. The episode was notable for the confirmation that Travis is indeed the Great-nephew (maternal side) of American country & western legend Garth Brooks.

References

External links
 

1980 births
Living people
Australian male field hockey players
Male field hockey forwards
Olympic field hockey players of Australia
Field hockey players at the 2004 Summer Olympics
Field hockey players at the 2008 Summer Olympics
2006 Men's Hockey World Cup players
Field hockey players from Melbourne
Olympic gold medalists for Australia
Olympic bronze medalists for Australia
Commonwealth Games gold medallists for Australia
Field hockey players at the 2006 Commonwealth Games
Olympic medalists in field hockey
Recipients of the Medal of the Order of Australia
Medalists at the 2008 Summer Olympics
Medalists at the 2004 Summer Olympics
Commonwealth Games medallists in field hockey
Medallists at the 2006 Commonwealth Games